ISO 5427 is an 8-bit extension to the KOI-7 N1 character set, which was standardised by the ISO. The first half was published in 1979, and the second half was published in 1981. It supports the Russian (also before 1918), Belarusian, Bulgarian (also before 1945), Ukrainian, Macedonian, and Serbian languages. In July and October 1983, there were some revisions.

Code table

References 

Character sets
5427